Now Spring 2007 is a compilation CD released by EMI Music Australia in 2007. It is the 18th CD in the Australian Now! series.

Track listing
Alex Gaudino featuring Crystal Waters – "Destination Calabria" (3:00)
Ricki-Lee – "Can't Touch It" (2:52)
Gym Class Heroes – "Clothes Off!!" (3:40)
Operator Please – "Just a Song About Ping Pong" (2:17)
Missy Higgins – "Where I Stood" (4:15)
Silverchair – "Reflections of a Sound" (4:09)
Kisschasy – "Opinions Won't Keep You Warm at Night" (3:05)
Ben Lee – "Love Me Like the World Is Ending" (3:44)
Armand Van Helden – "NYC Beat" (3:10)
Bob Sinclar featuring Dollarman and Gary Pine – "Sound of Freedom" (3:17)
Yellowcard – "Light Up the Sky" (3:32)
Evermore – "Never Let You Go" (4:16)
Lisa Mitchell – "Incomplete Lullaby" (3:42)
Jet – "Bring It on Back" (4:09)
Katie Noonan – "Time to Begin" (3:38)
The Beautiful Girls – "I Thought About You" (3:13)
Thirsty Merc – "The Hard Way" (4:21)
Airbourne – "Too Much, Too Young, Too Fast" (3:43)
The Chemical Brothers – "Do It Again" (3:40)
Paul Van Dyk featuring Jessica Sutta – "White Lies" (3:14)
Carl Kennedy vs. M.Y.N.C. Project featuring Roachford – "Ride the Storm" (Life Goes On Radio Edit) (3:09)
Meck featuring Dino – "Feels Like Home" (3:11)

External links
 NOW Spring 2007 @ Australian Charts

2007 compilation albums
Now That's What I Call Music! albums (Australian series)
EMI Records compilation albums